Manzanillo International Terminal (abbreviation: MIT, UN/LOCODE: PAMIT) is located east of the Atlantic opening of the Panama Canal on Manzanillo Bay, Colón Province, Panama.

MIT is a distribution center for cargo destined for cities within Panama and nearby countries in Central America and the Caribbean. It is one of the largest container transshipment terminals in the region and has direct access into the Colón Free Trade Zone (CFZ). MIT, has multimodal operations including container input and output from rail, vessel and gate operations.

History

The project area, known as South Coco Solo, was a US Navy seaplane base during the World War II era. The base reverted to Panama under the Torrijos–Carter Treaties of 1977.

During the 1980s, the area was used as a storage facility and distribution center for vehicles for Latin America. To avoid the  costs and logistics associated with moving cars to and from  Cristóbal, it was decided to build a roll-on/roll-off (RORO) berth at the distribution and storage facility and thereby directly import and export vehicles on site. Thus, the original concept of MIT was born.

By August 1993, with the entry of the multinational SSA Marine, the original RORO berth concept grew into a project to create a world-class container transshipment facility equipped with over 1,200 meters of  berth, ship-to-shore gantry cranes, and modern terminal management computer systems. The Atlantic terminus of the re-built Panama Canal Railway was constructed nearby.

MIT began operations on April 16, 1995.

Geographical Information
 The access channel is 3.0 kilometers from sea buoy.
 The breakwater opening is 200 meters wide, and the access channel has a depth of 14.0 meters.
 The turning basin diameter is 600 meters.

Storage
The terminal's total area is 520,000 square meters, with a container storage capacity of 37,000 TEU, and a container repair yard with 15,000 square meters, including 1,300 square meters of undercover repair facility and connections for 1,145 refrigerated containers.

Berthing
 Main berth: 1,240 meters of contiguous container berth with a depth of 14 meters alongside
 Extra berth: 400 meters of container berth with a depth of 14 meters alongside
 Ro-ro berth: 300-meter "Mediterranean-style" ro-ro berth with a depth of 12.5 meters alongside
All berths are 2.5 meters above MSL (mean sea level). Tide variance is 30 centimeters.

Government
Panama’s Quarantine and Customs departments have offices at MIT and can register clearances on MIT’s Mainsail information system. MIT is a phyto-zoosanitary zone certified by Panama’s agriculture department and can handle sensitive agricultural products.

Awards
The United Kingdom’s Containerisation International named MIT one of the world’s ten most efficient ports, and the terminal has been recognized three times as the "Best Container Terminal in the Caribbean" by the Caribbean Shipping Association.

External links
 Manzanillo International Terminal web site
 Manzanillo International Terminal at Port Source
 Manzanillo International Terminal Location at Google Maps
 Manzanillo International Terminal Photo
 

Container terminals
Ports and harbours of Panama
Buildings and structures in Colón Province